Alexander James Lockie (11 April 1915 – 1974) was an English professional footballer who played as a defender for Sunderland.

References

1915 births
1974 deaths
Footballers from South Shields
English footballers
Association football defenders
Sunderland A.F.C. players
Notts County F.C. players
English Football League players